Infiesto is a 2023 Spanish mystery thriller film written and directed by  which stars Isak Férriz and .

Plot 

Cast

Production 
Infiesto is a Vaca Films production. Filming took over 7 weeks, taking place in Asturian and Galician locations, including Infiesto, the San Rafael Hospital in A Coruña, and the San Amaro Hermitage in Seoane, Forcarei.

Release 
The film debuted on Netflix streaming on 3 February 2023.

See also 
 List of Spanish films of 2023

References 

Films shot in Asturias
Spanish-language Netflix original films
Spanish mystery thriller films
Films shot in Galicia (Spain)
Films set in Asturias
Films set in 2020
Films about the COVID-19 pandemic
Vaca Films films
2022 crime thriller films
2020s Spanish films
2020s Spanish-language films